Scandolara Ravara is a comune (municipality) in the Province of Cremona in the Italian region Lombardy, located about  southeast of Milan and about  southeast of Cremona.

Scandolara Ravara borders the following municipalities: Cingia de' Botti, Gussola, Motta Baluffi, San Martino del Lago, Solarolo Rainerio, Torricella del Pizzo.

Main sights
Altar of Ilumvius, the relic of Roman funerary altar
Old Church (Chiesa Vecchia)

References

Cities and towns in Lombardy